Fires Creek is a recreational area located in the Nantahala National Forest in Clay County, North Carolina. It takes its name from Fires Creek, which runs through it. The area offers paved and unpaved hiking trails, swimming holes, camping spots, picnic tables, grills, scenic views, horseback riding, fishing.

Fires Creek Rim Trail
Fires Creek Rim Trail is a 23.4 mile hiking and horseback riding trail within Nantahala National Forest that travels around the rim of Fires Creek Wildlife Management Area and is marked with a blue blaze. It offers several side trail and access roads and is generally entered from the Fire's Creek Picnic Area along the trail to Leatherwood Falls. Upon reaching Leatherwood Falls, Fire's Creek Rim Trail travels right as it climbs to the ridge.

Trails and Peaks along Fires Creek Rim Trail include:

Big Stamp (4,337') to Weatherman Bald (4,960') 5.4 miles, average hiking time 4 hrs
Weatherman Bald to Tusquitee Bald (5,240') 1.9 miles, average hiking time 2.5 hrs
Tusquitee Bald to Chestnut Stump Knob (4,400') 2.6 miles, average hiking time 3 hrs
Chestnut Stump Knob to Carver Gap (2,996') 3.5 miles, average hiking time of 3.5 hrs
Carver Gap to Hunter Camp (1,800') 3.75 miles, average hiking time of 2 hrs.

References

Protected areas of Clay County, North Carolina
Nantahala National Forest
Bodies of water of Clay County, North Carolina